Chocolate is a Malayalam-language romantic comedy film released in 2007, directed by Shafi. Main actors are Prithviraj, Jayasurya, Roma Asrani, Samvrutha Sunil and Remya Nabeeshan. The film has been remade in Telugu as Chalaki with Aditya Babu.

Plot 
One seat is reserved for boys for the PG course at St. Mary's Women's College, where Vanaja works as a teacher. It may be given to the boys at the discretion of the principal. The teacher is trying to get the seat for her son Shyam Balagopal, who got nine suspensions and seven police cases in the college where he is studying. Principal Elena John gives the seat to Shyam, on the assurance of the teacher that he will take care of his son without causing any problems.

Things were not going well for Shyam, the lone male of three thousand girls. The group, which includes Ann Mathews, daughter of PTA President Mathews, Nandana Bahuleyan, daughter of Bahuleyan and Susan, tries to smoke Shyam out. The group led by their opponent Preeta is also in favor of Shyam. Gradually Shyam and Ann Mathews get closer to each other. But they do not openly like each other. Meanwhile, fashion designer Ranjith seeks Shyam's help to persuade Nandana to model at the Femina Show. Shyam and his friends Pappan and Ranjith break up their marriage proposal with Manuel Ebrah, who comes to Ann Mathews. Knowing that Ranjith is in love with Nandana, Shyam brings his friends and Ranjith to college in the name of training children as part of the University Fest. Ann breaks up with Shyam over the breakup of her marriage to Manuel. Meanwhile, Bahuleyan, who gets photos of Shyam and Nandana interacting closely, comes with goons and attacks Shyam. Shyam quarrels with Ann over the idea that the photo was sent by Ann. Bahuleyan gets photos again and comes back with goons. Knowing this, Nandana goes to the hotel where Shyam is staying to inform Shyam. Police Inspector Antony and his team arrest Nandana and Shyam following an anonymous message that there is disorder in the hotel. Although Ramabhadran was released by the IPS, the news came in the yellow papers. Ann reveals the secret behind Preeta's sending the photo and calling the police when she decides to marry Shyam and Nandana as a solution to the problem at the PTA meeting. Marriage with Ranjith and Nandana is decided. The film ends with the reunion between the misunderstood Ann and Shyam.

Cast 

 Prithviraj Sukumaran as Shyam Balagopal
 Jayasurya as Renjith
 Roma Asrani as Ann Mathews
 Samvrutha Sunil as Nandana Bahuleyan
 Remya Nambeesan as Sussan Thomas
 Salim Kumar as Pappan
 Saiju Kurup as Manuel Abraham, Ann's groom
 Lalu Alex as Mathews
 Rajan P. Dev as Bahuleyan
 Vanitha Krishnachandran as Prof. Vanaja, Syam's mother
 Shari as Eleena John, College Principal
 Shahnu as Preetha K.V
 Bindu Panicker as Maria
 Anoop Chandran as Niyas
 Rony David as Sunil Abraham
 P. Sreekumar as Abraham
 Ambika Mohan as Rossie Abraham
 Gayathri as Prof. Ambily
 Manoj Guinness as Chakkyarkuthukaran
 Spadikam George as CI Anirudhan
 Sadiq as Police Officer
 Subbalakshmi as Dance teacher
 Deepika Mohan as Nandana's mother

Box office
The film was both commercial and critical success.

Music Track 
The film's music by Alex Paul and lyrics by Vayalar Sarath Chandra Varma.
 "Kalkanda Malaye" – Rimi Tomy, Liji Francis, Akhila Anand
 "Chocolate" – M.G. Sreekumar, Rimi Tomy
 "Ishtamalle" – Shahabaz Aman 
 "Tamarayum Sooryanum" – K. J. Yesudas
 "Tamarayum Sooryanum" – Jyotsna Radhakrishnan

References

External links 
 'Chocolate' captivates Kerala, earth times news
 Life is sweeter for Jayasurya after Chocolate, rediff news
 Chocolate – A campus flick by HinduOnline
 New Indian Express 
 

2007 films
2000s Malayalam-language films
Malayalam films remade in other languages
Films shot in Kochi
Films directed by Shafi
2007 romantic comedy films